The Como School, on Spruce St. in Como, Colorado, is a school complex its oldest building, a grade school with a belltower, built in 1883.  It was listed on the National Register of Historic Places in 2000.

The grade school building is a wood-frame structure that was a one-room schoolhouse, serving students in grades one through four on one side of the aisle and grades five through eight on the other.

The property also included a wood frame high school building which was moved to the property in the 1930s, two outhouses, and a storage shed.

The school operated from 1883 to 1948. In 2010 the grade school building was identified as the Como Civic Center.

References

One-room schoolhouses in Colorado
National Register of Historic Places in Park County, Colorado
School buildings completed in 1883
School buildings on the National Register of Historic Places in Colorado